Victor Jules Levasseur (1795–1862) was a French cartographer widely known for his distinctive decorative style.  He produced numerous maps more admired for the artistic content of the scenes and data surrounding the map than for the detail of the map.

French cartographers
1800 births
1870 deaths
1795 births
1862 deaths